Defending champion Evonne Goolagong defeated Martina Navratilova in the final, 6–3, 6–2 to win the women's singles tennis title at the 1975 Australian Open. It was her fourth major singles title.

Seeds

Draw

Key
 Q = Qualifier
 WC = Wild card
 LL = Lucky loser
 r = Retired

Finals

Earlier rounds

Section 1

Section 2

Section 3

Section 4

External links
 1975 Australian Open – Women's draws and results at the International Tennis Federation

Women's singles
Australian Open (tennis) by year – Women's singles
1974 in Australian women's sport
1975 in Australian women's sport
1975 WTA Tour